The Isle of Dogs is an area of London, caused by a meander in the River Thames.

Isle of Dogs can also refer to:
 The Isle of Dogs (play), a 16th-century play by Thomas Nashe and Ben Jonson
 Isle of Dogs, a 2001 novel by Patricia Cornwell
 Isle of Dogs (film), a 2018 animated film by Wes Anderson

See also
 Dog Island (disambiguation), for other places with a similar name